The 2017 Costa Rica earthquake occurred 16 kilometres southeast of Jacó, which is about 100 kilometres southwest of the capital, San Jose on November 12, 2017. At first, the quake was measured at a magnitude of 6.8, it was a magnitude 6.5 earthquake with a max intensity of VIII (Severe) on the Mercalli intensity scale. The quake was felt most severely in the provincial districts of Quepos, Parrita and Garabito—of which Jacó is capital. The earthquake killed at least 3 people. The earthquake could be felt throughout Costa Rica, and in some parts of Nicaragua and Panama. Also, it was followed by more than 20 aftershocks throughout the night, the first measuring 5.1 just four minutes after the first quake.

Damage 
Electricity was knocked out in some areas. There was no major infrastructure damage from the tremor that hit the lightly populated area. At least one building in Jacó had been evacuated due to apparent damage and there were reports of walls collapsing and objects falling in other parts of the country. South Jacó had lost power lines and there were downed poles. There were landslides due to the quake that had caused a blockage on the highway from Jacó to other cities.

References

External links

2017 earthquakes
2017 in Costa Rica
Earthquakes in Costa Rica
November 2017 events in North America